The Manning College of Information and Computer Sciences (formerly known as CICS) is a college at the University of Massachusetts Amherst. Computer Science at University of Massachusetts Amherst began as a department in 1964. In 2012, the Department of Computer Science became a school, and in 2015 it became the College of Information and Computer Sciences.

History

Early years

Computer science started as a subsection of the Chemistry Department of UMass Amherst in 1961. Later, it was formally developed into the Research Computing Center (RCC). In 1965, the University began accepting graduate students for its M.S. program in Computer Science. Two years later, in 1967, Conrad Wogrin of Yale University was appointed Director of the RCC, at this point renamed as the University Computing Center (UCC).  That same year, UMass participated in the founding of the New England Regional Computing Program for sharing computer facilities and developed the Unlimited Machine Access from Scattered Sites (UMASS) timesharing system on campus. In 1972, the first UMass PhD program for computer science (revolving around systems, theory of computation, and cybernetics) was approved, and the Masters program for computer science was upgraded into Computer Science in the Graduate School to a Department of  Computer and Information Science (COINS). Michael Arbib of Stanford University lead as the head of COINS from 1972 up until his departure in 1986. When Lederle Graduate Center opened in 1974, the young department became one of the major fields of academia located in the building. In the mid to late 70s, COINS graduated its first student, Suad Alagic, as well as one of its first undergraduate students. By the start of the 1980s, UMass had 80 undergraduate students, 90 graduate students, and 12 faculty members, as well as a grant income at the scale of hundreds of thousands of dollars.  In 1984, UMass joined the BITNET network, which allowed for students and faculty to e-mail one another.

1990s to present

Starting in 1990, COINS founded and lead the Massachusetts Computer Science Education Consortium (MCSEC) with the goal of investing in computer science education for the entire state of Massachusetts. In addition, the department started its first newsletter, Loose Change. From 1991-1992, research funds for the department grew immensely, establishing the Center for Intelligent Information Retrieval (CIIR), the Department of Defense Center of Excellence in Artificial Intelligence, and the Center for Autonomous, Real-Time Systems (CARTS).  In 1992, COINS was renamed to the Department of Computer Science.

From 1990 to 2000, the Department grew to 403 undergraduate students, 97 technical faculty, 37 teaching faculty, and 164 graduate students. The Department also moved to the newly established Computer Science Research Center, located at the northern portion of campus.  In 2010, the undergraduate bachelors' degree in computer science split into a B.S. and a B.A. By 2015, the Department of Computer Science (intermittently renamed as the School of Computer Science) was finally renamed to the College of Computer and Information Sciences (CICS).

In the fall of 2021, a "transformative" donation of $18 million was gifted by UMass alumni Robert and Donna Manning. In their honor, the school was renamed the Robert and Donna Manning College of Information and Computer Sciences. Additionally, Massachusetts governor Charlie Baker committed to putting $75 million into the program in the coming years. With its enhanced endowment, the College has stated plans for expansion, including a construction of new buildings and to admit more students to all levels of degrees.

Academics 

The College of Information and Computer Sciences at UMass Amherst ranks at #20 of the top 100 computer science departments of universities in the United States, and #11 in artificial intelligence.  The website csrankings.org (developed by UMass computer science professor Emery Berger), a tool used to show which universities have the highest computer science research output, ranked UMass at #18 out of all universities in North America.

As of the 2019-2020 schoolyear, there were 2,679 students enrolled in computer science related degrees, including PhDs, B.S. and B.A. in Computer Science, B.S. in Informatics, undergraduates in the Exploratory Track, as well as IT and computer science minors. Admissions to all levels of degrees is competitive, with a ~35% acceptance rate for undergraduates, ~30% acceptance rate for graduate students, and <20% acceptance rate for PhD students as of 2020.  The admissions statistics for rising undergraduate freshmen in 2019 was a GPA of 4.2 and an average SAT of 1457.  The average salary of a 2019 CICS bachelor's graduate was $90,000, and for graduate students was $110,000; 65% of undergraduates participated in an internship during their time in school as well.

Research centers 

Center for Data Science
Center for Intelligent Information Retrieval
Center for Smart & Connected Society
Computational Social Science Institute
Cybersecurity Institute
Biologically Inspired Neural & Dynamical Systems Laboratory
Computer Vision Research Laboratory
Information Extraction and Synthesis Laboratory
Knowledge Discovery Laboratory
Laboratory for Perceptual Robotics
Resource Bounded Reasoning Lab

Notable faculty

References

External links 
  College of Information and Computer Sciences official site

University of Massachusetts Amherst schools
University subdivisions in Massachusetts